The National Indigenous Music Awards 2011 are the 8th annual National Indigenous Music Awards; However (and despite its name), 2011 was the first time the event went national after its first seven years had purely focused on the Northern Territory artists.

The nominations were announced on 10 August 2011 and awards ceremony was held on 20 August 2011.

Performers

Hall of Fame Inductee 
 Coloured Stone & No Fixed Address
Coloured Stone is a band that formed in 1977 from the Koonibba Mission, South Australia. The won the ARIA Award for Best Indigenous Release at the ARIA Music Awards of 1987.

No Fixed Address is an Australian Aboriginal reggae rock group formed in 1979. They released Wrong Side of the Road in 1981 and From My Eyes in 1982, both peaked with the Australian top 100.

Awards
Act of the Year

New Talent of the Year

Album of the Year

DVD/Film Clip of the Year

Song of the Year

Artwork of the Year

Traditional Music Award

References

2011 in Australian music
2011 music awards
National Indigenous Music Awards